Route 267 is a two-lane north/south highway on the south shore of the Saint Lawrence River in Quebec, Canada. Its northern terminus is in Plessisville at the junction of Route 265, and the southern terminus is at the junction of Route 269 in Adstock (secteur Saint-Méthode).

List of towns along Route 267
 Plessisville
 Inverness
 Saint-Jean-de-Brébeuf
 Thetford Mines
 Adstock

See also
 List of Quebec provincial highways

References

External links 
 Route 267 on Google Maps
 Provincial Route Map (Courtesy of the Quebec Ministry of Transportation) 

267